State Route 342 (SR 342) is a  state highway in eastern Ohio. The short route connects SR 258 in the Perry Township community of West Chester to SR 800 in the village of Freeport.

Route description
The state highway begins at an intersection in the center of West Chester, a community within Perry Township. SR 258 continues to the north and west of this intersection; West Chester South Road heads south. SR 342 travels due east for the  portion of the route within Tuscarawas County but then shifts east-southeast as it enters Harrison County. The route travels through hilly terrain but mainly stays near the tops of ridges except when it descends into valleys in order to cross the Atkinson Creek and the Stillwater Creek. At the Stillwater Creek bridge, the route enters the village of Freeport. Within Freeport, SR 342 winds its way through the center of the village on Westchester Road, North High Street, and West Main Street. At the intersection of Main Street and Philadelphia Street, SR 342 terminates as SR 800 continues to the south and east of this intersection.

History
The road connecting West Chester and Freeport (at what was then-designated SR 8) was added to the state highway system as SR 342 around 1933. The road was gravel-paved from its inception until it was paved with asphalt between 1953 and 1955. No other major changes have occurred to the route since then.

Major intersections

References

External links

342
Transportation in Tuscarawas County, Ohio
Transportation in Harrison County, Ohio